Leonhard Adelt (17 June 1881, Boizenburg – 21 February 1945) was a German translator and writer.

External links
 

1881 births
1945 deaths
People from Ludwigslust-Parchim
People from the Grand Duchy of Mecklenburg-Schwerin
Writers from Mecklenburg-Western Pomerania
German male non-fiction writers
20th-century German translators